The Canton of Douarnenez is a French canton, located in the Finistère département (Brittany région). Since the French canton reorganisation which came into effect in March 2015, the communes of the canton of Douarnenez are:

Audierne
Beuzec-Cap-Sizun
Cléden-Cap-Sizun
Confort-Meilars
Douarnenez (seat)
Goulien
Île-de-Sein
Le Juch
Kerlaz
Mahalon
Plogoff
Plouhinec
Pont-Croix
Pouldergat
Primelin
Poullan-sur-Mer

See also
Cantons of the Finistère department
List of cantons of France
Arrondissements of the Finistère department

References

Cantons of Finistère